Hadiputradila Saswadimata (born 5 February 2000) is a Singaporean footballer who plays as a winger for Tanjong Pagar United in the S.League.  He is the son of former Singapore national football player Saswadimata Dasuki.

Career statistics

Club

Notes

References

Living people
2000 births
Singaporean footballers
Association football midfielders
Tanjong Pagar United FC players
Singapore Premier League players